Melica ciliata, the hairy melic or silky spike melic, is a species of flowering plant in the grass family Poaceae, native to Europe, north Africa and temperate Asia. It has been introduced to South Australia.

Description
The species is a tufted deciduous perennial with elongated rhizomes. The leaf sheaths are tubular and closed; the ligule is an eciliate membrane. Their surface is scabrous and glabrous and the tip is attenuate. The panicle is contracted, reaching  in length. The spikelets are cuneate with one fertile floret. The florets are on pedicels.

Both the lower and upper glumes lack keels. The palea have 2-veined, ciliated keels while the fertile lemma is keelless, lanceolate, with an acute apex and ciliated margins. The flowers are fleshy, oblong, truncate, with two lodicules and three anthers. The fruit is a caryopsis.

References

ciliata
Bunchgrasses of Europe
Bunchgrasses of Africa
Bunchgrasses of Asia
Flora of Western Asia
Flora of North Africa
Flora of Algeria
Flora of Chad
Flora of Egypt
Flora of Lebanon
Flora of Libya
Flora of Sudan
Plants described in 1753
Taxa named by Carl Linnaeus
Flora of Malta